This is the list of commanders-in-chief of Safavid Iran. The amount of power the holder of the post had, fluctuated quite significantly throughout the centuries.

List of commanders-in-chief

Notes

Sources
 
 

Commanders-in-chief of Safavid Iran
Lists of office-holders in Iran
Iranian military-related lists